Naujienos with the English subtitle The Lithuanian Daily News was a Lithuanian-language socialist daily newspaper published from Chicago, United States. Established in February 1914, it became the first daily of the Lithuanian-Americans. After the October Revolution of 1917, the newspaper shifted its political orientation away from communism and socialism and towards social democracy. The newspaper helped to raise funds for Lituanica and Lituanica II, two transatlantic flights by Lithuanian pilots. As of 1960, it had a circulation of around 14,000. Pijus Grigaitis (1914–1919, 1919–1969) and Martynas Gudelis (1969–1986) were the long-time editors of the paper. Soon after Gudelis, the newspaper ceased publication.

See also
Vilnis (Chicago newspaper)

References

External links
 Chicago's Immigrant Workers And Their Press, AEJMC Conference Papers

1980s disestablishments in Illinois

Lithuanian-language newspapers published in the United States

Publications established in 1914
Defunct newspapers published in Chicago
Lithuanian-American culture in Chicago
Publications disestablished in the 1980s
1914 establishments in Illinois